The Asiatic Land Tenure and Indian Representation Act, 1946 (Act No. 28 of 1946; subsequently renamed the Asiatic Land Tenure Act, 1946, and also known as the "Ghetto Act") of South Africa sought to confine Asian ownership and occupation of land to certain clearly defined areas of towns. The Act also prohibited Asians from owning or occupying property without a permit when such property had not been owned or occupied by Asians before 1946.

Furthermore, it granted Indians in the Transvaal and Natal the right to elect Whites to represent them in Parliament and for Natal Indians to represent themselves in the Natal Provincial Council.

The Act deprived the Asian South Africans of communal representation and took away their fundamental and elementary right of land ownership and occupation. It is called and regarded universally by Indian people as the "Ghetto Act".

The act struck at the heart of Indian commercial and economic life. Not only did it intend to reduce the levels of Indian trade and reduce progress in the acquisition of fixed property, it also is thought to have reduced the opportunities of the masses of the Indian people to earn a decent living and ultimately condemn them to existence in increasingly over-crowded slums and locations. Thus on 31 March 1948, it is thought that about 6,000 Indians marched in protest to the Act in Durban, South Africa.

The sections of the act granting representation in Parliament and the provincial council were repealed by the Asiatic Laws Amendment Act, 1948. The rest of the act was repealed by the Abolition of Racially Based Land Measures Act, 1991.

See also
 :Category:Apartheid laws in South Africa
 Apartheid in South Africa

References

External links
 African History: Apartheid Legislation in South Africa
 Brief description of the Asiatic Land Tenure and Representation Act 1946 No. 28

Apartheid laws in South Africa
1946 in South African law
South African people of Indian descent
History of South Africa
History of Durban